Travis Dye (born August 24, 1999) is an American football running back for the USC Trojans. He previously played for the Oregon Ducks.

Early years
Dye attended Norco High School in Norco, California. As a senior, he was the Big VIII League Offensive Player of the Year after he had 2,383 rushing yards on 255 carries with 34 touchdowns. He committed to the University of Oregon to play college football.

College career
Dye played at Oregon from 2018 to 2021. As a true freshman in 2018, he played in all 13 games with two starts as a backup to CJ Verdell. He rushed for 739 yards on 140 carries with four touchdowns. He was again Verdell's backup in 2019, rushing for 658 yards over 106 carries in 14 games and three starts. Dye appeared in all seven games with three starts in 2020 and had 443 rushing yards on 64 carries with a touchdown. He was Oregon's leading rusher his final year there in 2021, finishing with 1,271 yards over 211 carries with 16 touchdowns.

Prior to the 2022 season, Dye transferred to the University of Southern California (USC).

Statistics

Personal life
Dye's brothers, Troy and Tony, have played in the NFL.

References

External links
USC Trojans bio

Living people
People from Norco, California
Players of American football from California
American football running backs
Oregon Ducks football players
USC Trojans football players
1999 births